Ahmed Bushara Wahba (born 1943) is a Sudanese footballer. He competed in the men's tournament at the 1972 Summer Olympics.

Ahmed Wahba Bushara has a 14 year old grandchild named Bushra Mamoun.

References

External links
 

1943 births
Living people
Sudanese footballers
Sudan international footballers
Olympic footballers of Sudan
Footballers at the 1972 Summer Olympics
1970 African Cup of Nations players
1972 African Cup of Nations players
Africa Cup of Nations-winning players
Al-Merrikh SC players
Place of birth missing (living people)
Association football midfielders